= Talwai =

- Village
- Location in Karnataka, India Talwai (India)
- Coordinates: 15°31′N 75°07′E
- Country: India
- State: Karnataka
- District: Dharwad

Population (2011)
  - Total: 932

Languages
  - Official: Kannada
- Time zone: UTC+5:30 (IST)

Talwai is a village in Dharwad district of Karnataka, India.

== Demographics ==
As of the 2011 Census of India there were 181 households in Talwai and a total population of 932 consisting of 490 males and 442 females. There were 132 children ages 0-6.
